Caelostomus striatocollis is a species of ground beetle in the subfamily Pterostichinae. It was described by Pierre François Marie Auguste Dejean in 1831.

References

Caelostomus
Beetles described in 1831